Triple Play 98 is a baseball sports video game released for the PlayStation and Microsoft Windows in 1997. It was developed and published by EA Sports, and is part of the Triple Play series after Triple Play 97. The game's cover features Brian Jordan of the St. Louis Cardinals.

Reception 

The game received favorable reviews on both platforms according to the review aggregation website GameRankings. The most widely praised elements were the realistic graphics and animation and the comprehensiveness of the modes and features; GameSpot called the PlayStation version "the most thoroughly complete console baseball game ever." The unprecedented two-man commentary was also met with general approval, though some found the low frame rate interferes with the gameplay. Next Generation said: "The game still has some flaws with the AI, a slow frame-rate, and too much delay between batters, but in the end there is no baseball game on PlayStation that can even come close to Triple Play in graphics or playability." GamePro gave it a 4.5 out of 5 for control and a perfect 5 in every other category (graphics, sound, and fun factor), saying, "Tuned for novices and pros alike, the gameplay's rewarding and fun, and really brings to life the intensity of the pitcher-batter confrontation." In Japan, where the same console version was ported for release under the name  on September 25, 1997, Famitsu gave it a score of 26 out of 40.

The Electric Playground’s Tommy Tallarico gave the game an 8.5, while co-host Victor Lucas gave it a 9.

References

External links 
 

1997 video games
PlayStation (console) games
Triple Play video games
Video games developed in Canada
Windows games